Sophie Papps (born 6 October 1994) is a British sprinter. She competed in the 60 metres event at the 2014 IAAF World Indoor Championships.

References

1994 births
Living people
British female sprinters
Place of birth missing (living people)
Athletes (track and field) at the 2014 Commonwealth Games
Commonwealth Games competitors for England